Nehemiah Abbott (March 29, 1804 – July 26, 1877) was a United States representative from Maine. He was born in Sidney, studied law at the Litchfield, Connecticut Law School, was admitted to the bar in 1836 and began his practice at Calais, Maine.

In 1839 Abbott moved to Columbus, Mississippi, where he continued the practice of law, but the following year he returned to Maine and settled in Belfast, Waldo County, where he resumed the practice of law. In 1842 and 1843 he was a member of the Maine House of Representatives. He was elected as a Republican to the U.S. House of Representatives, serving from March 4, 1857, to March 3, 1859. He did not run for reelection, but continued to practice law, and served as the mayor of Belfast in 1865 and 1866. He died in Belfast.

References

External links

1804 births
1877 deaths
Republican Party members of the Maine House of Representatives
People from Belfast, Maine
Politicians from Calais, Maine
Mayors of places in Maine
People from Kennebec County, Maine
Republican Party members of the United States House of Representatives from Maine
19th-century American politicians